is a Japanese former professional tennis player. She is a younger sister of Haruka Inoue.

A right-handed player, Inoue began competing on the professional tour in the late 1990s. She left the tour in 2003, before returning in 2007 and featuring as a doubles specialist. 

During her career she was most successful in doubles, with a best ranking of 139. She made several WTA Tour main draw appearances in doubles and won nine doubles titles on the ITF circuit. As a singles player she was ranked as high as 299 in the world, winning two ITF titles.

Inoue, who retired in 2012, is married to former tennis player Bumpei Sato.

ITF finals

Singles (2–2)

Doubles (9–11)

References

External links
 
 

1979 births
Living people
Japanese female tennis players
Sportspeople from Okinawa Prefecture
20th-century Japanese women
21st-century Japanese women